Jean-Marie Poumeyrol (born at Libourne on June 8, 1946) is a French artist.

Much of his early work consisted of erotica and hallucinogenic art, but as his art has developed he has shown a great interest in landscapes as well. He is an exponent of the fantastic realism movement.

References

External links
 The art of Jean-Marie Poumeyrol
 

French artists
1946 births
Living people